Mustafa Pasha may refer to:

People 
 Çoban Mustafa Pasha (died 1529), Ottoman vizier and governor of Egypt (1522–23)
 Koca Mustafa Pasha (fl. 1511–1512), Ottoman grand vizier (1511–12)
 Kara Şahin Mustafa Pasha (fl. 1524–1566), Ottoman governor of Egypt (1560–63) and founder of the Ridwan dynasty
 Mustafa Pasha, governor-general of Lahsa in 1559, see Lahsa Eyalet
 Lala Kara Mustafa Pasha (died 1580), Ottoman general and grand vizier (1580)
 Mustafa Pasha (died 1614), Islamic name of Manuchar II Jaqeli during his tenure under the Ottomans
 Mustafa Pasha, governor of Damascus in 1623, see Mount Lebanon Emirate
 Kemankeş Mustafa Pasha (1592–1644), Ottoman grand vizier (1638–44)
 Lefkeli Mustafa Pasha (died 1648), Ottoman grand vizier (1622) and governor of Egypt (1618)
 Kara Mustafa Pasha ( 1630–1683), Ottoman grand vizier (1676–83)
 Kara Mustafa Pasha (governor of Egypt) (died 1627), Ottoman governor of Egypt (1623, 1624–26)
 Bozoklu Mustafa Pasha (died 1698), Ottoman grand vizier (1693–94)
 Mustafa Pasha ( 1748), Ottoman governor of Rhodes, see Manuel Pinto da Fonseca
 Köse Bahir Mustafa Pasha (died 1765), Grand Vizier of the Ottoman Empire and governor of Egypt, see List of Ottoman Grand Viziers
 Mustafa Pasha Kara Mehmed-zade (fl. July 1755), Ottoman governor of Skopje
 Hadži Mustafa Pasha (1733—1801)
 Mustafa Pasha (Egypt) ( 1800), Ottoman commander defeated by Napoleon Bonaparte in 1799
 Mustafa Naili Pasha (1798–1871), Ottoman grand vizier (1853–54, 1857)
 Mustafa Reşid Pasha (1800–1858), Ottoman statesman, diplomat, reformer, and grand vizier (1846–58) during Tanzimat
 Mustafa Pasha (naval officer) (1804–1877), British naval officer Adolphus Slade, known as Mustafa Pasha in Ottoman service
 Mustafa Celalettin Pasha (1826–1876), participant in Polish and Ottoman uprisings, strategist, and writer
 Mustafa Fazl Pasha (1830–1875), Egyptian prince, grandson of Muhammad Ali Pasha
 Mustafa Zihni Pasha (1838–1911), Ottoman official and founding member of the nationalist Kürt Teali Cemiyeti society
 Mustafa Fahmi Pasha (1840–1914), former Prime Minister of Egypt
 Mustafa Hilmi Pasha (1840–1922), general of the Ottoman Army
 Mustafa Yamulki (1866–1936), Ottoman general and Minister of Education of the Kingdom of Kurdistan (previously Nemrud Mustafa Pasha)
 Mustafa Kamil Pasha (1874–1908), Egyptian nationalist, lawyer, and journalist
 Mustafa el-Nahhas Pasha (1879–1965), former Prime Minister of Egypt
 Mustafa Fevzi Çakmak (1876–1950), Turkish field marshal and politician
 Mustafa Kemal Atatürk (1881–1938), founder of the Republic of Turkey

Other 
 Koca Mustafa Pasha Mosque, a former Byzantine church converted into a mosque by the Ottomans, located in Istanbul, Turkey
 Atik Mustafa Pasha Mosque, a former Byzantine church converted into a mosque by the Ottomans, located in Istanbul Turkey
 Mustafa Pasha Mosque, an Ottoman-era mosque located in the Old Bazaar of Skopje, Macedonia
 Mustafa Pasha Bridge, a bridge located in Svilengrad, Bulgaria

See also
 Jisri Mustafa Pasha (Cisri Mustafa Paşa), former name of Svilengrad, Bulgaria